The Bangsamoro Party (BAPA) is a political party based in Mindanao, Philippines, which is affiliated with the Moro National Liberation Front (MNLF).

History
The Bangsamoro Party is a political party affiliated with the Moro National Liberation Front (MNLF). It was already extant sometime between 2016 and 2018 during the implementation of the United Nations Development Programme (UNDP) "Peace and Reconciliation Initiatives for Empowerment (PRIME) in the Bangsamoro" when the MNLF is led by Executive Council of 15 chair Yusop Jikiri.

The MNLF under Jikiri's successor Muslimin Sema launched the Bangsamoro Party (BAPA) on January 8, 2022. The ceremony was held at the MNLF's Camp Ebrahim Sema and was attended by representatives from Basilan, Sulu, Tawi-Tawi, Zamboanga del Sur, Zamboanga Sibugay, Lanao del Sur, Lanao del Norte, Maguindanao and Soccsksargen's four provinces. The party is presented as a supporter of the Bangsamoro government which is administered by interim Chief Minister Murad Ebrahim, who is also the chair of the MNLF's rival group Moro Islamic Liberation Front.

See also
United Bangsamoro Justice Party

References

Regionalist parties in the Philippines
Moro National Liberation Front